Dorcadion shestopalovi is a species of beetle in the family Cerambycidae. It was described by Mikhail Leontievich Danilevsky in 1993. It is known from the Caucasus.

References

shestopalovi
Beetles described in 1993